South San Gabriel may refer to:
 South San Gabriel, California
 South San Gabriel (band), an alternative country band based in Denton, Texas, named after the San Gabriel river fork